Candiopella reunionalis is a species of snout moth in the genus Candiopella. It was described by Christian Guillermet in 2007 and is known from Réunion.

References

Moths described in 2007
Phycitinae
Moths of Réunion
Endemic fauna of Réunion